The 2009–10 USHL season is the 31st season of the United States Hockey League as an all-junior league. The regular season began on October 2, 2009, and concluded on April 3, 2010, with the regular season champion winning the Anderson Cup. The 2009–10 USHL season was the first to include both the Youngstown Phantoms and the US Nation Team Development Program, both of whom left the North American Hockey League. As a result of two new teams being added to the East Division, the Des Moines Buccaneers were moved to the West Division.

The Clark Cup playoffs featured the top four teams from each division competing for the league title.

Regular season
Final Standings

Note: GP = Games played; W = Wins; L = Losses; OTL = Overtime losses; SL = Shootout losses; GF = Goals for; GA = Goals against; PTS = Points; x = clinched playoff berth; y = clinched division title; z = clinched league title

East Division

West Division

Clark Cup Playoffs

Players

Scoring leaders

Leading goaltenders

Awards
Coach of the Year: Jon Cooper Green Bay Gamblers
Curt Hammer Award: Derek Arnold Waterloo Black Hawks
Defenseman of the Year: David Makowski Green Bay Gamblers
Executive of the Year: Ben Robert Omaha Lancers
Forward of the Year: Jaden Schwartz Tri-City Storm
General Manager of the Year: Jon Cooper Green Bay Gamblers
Goaltender of the Year: Steve Summerhays Green Bay Gamblers
Organization of the Year: Omaha Lancers
Player of the Year: Matt White Omaha Lancers
Rookie of the Year: Anders Lee Green Bay Gamblers
Scholar-Athlete of the Year: Anthony Hamburg Omaha Lancers, Matt Mahalak Youngstown Phantoms

First Team All-Stars

 Steve Summerhays (Goalie) Green Bay Gamblers
 David Makowski (Defense) Green Bay Gamblers
 Bryce Aneloski (Defense) Cedar Rapids RoughRiders
 Matt White (Forward) Omaha Lancers
 Jaden Schwartz (forward) Tri-City Storm
 Anders Lee (forward) Green Bay Gamblers

Second Team All-Stars
 Jeff Teglia (Goalie) Omaha Lancers
 Anthony Bitetto (Defense) Indiana Ice
 C.J. Ludwig (Defense) Omaha Lancers
 J.T. Brown (Forward) Waterloo Black Hawks
 Brock Montpetit (Forward) Waterloo Black Hawks
 Erik Haula (Forward) Omaha Lancers

References

External links
 Official website of the United States Hockey League

Ushl
United States Hockey League seasons